The Naaz islands (also Naz islands) are two tidal islands in the Persian gulf, on the shore of Qeshm Island. At low tide, the intertidal zone of Qeshm connects the islands to the shore and at high tide the littoral zone is submerged and two hills become islands. Naaz islands are a tourist attractions of Qeshm Island and the south of Iran.

References

Qeshm County
Islands of the Persian Gulf
Tidal islands
Islands of Iran